Orhei Fort is a historic fort in the Republic of Moldova, in Old Orhei.

See also
 Old Orhei

References

External links
 Cronologia cetatii medievale de piatra 

Castles in Moldova
Castles in Moldavia
Tourist attractions in Moldova
Orhei